"Procabacteriaceae" is a Candidatus family of uncultivated Gram-negative Betaproteobacteria.  The sole genus, "Procabacter", was identified as an obligate endosymbiont of Acanthamoeba.

References

External links
 Procabacteriaceae List of Prokaryotic Names with Standing in Nomenclature

Betaproteobacteria
Candidatus taxa